The 2010 Pan American Weightlifting Championships were held at the Coliseo Deportivo Ciudad de los Deportes Juan José Arévalo Bermejo F.G. in Guatemala City, Guatemala. The event took place from May 26 to 30, 2010.

Medal summary

Men

Women

References
General
2010 IWF Pan American Championships Results

Specific

External links

Pan American Weightlifting Championships
Pan American Weightlifting Championships
Pan American Weightlifting Championships
International weightlifting competitions hosted by Guatemala